Secunderabad Assembly constituency is a constituency of Telangana Legislative Assembly, India. It is one of 15 constituencies in Capital city of Hyderabad. It is part of Secunderabad Lok Sabha constituency.

T. Padma Rao, current deputy speaker is representing the constituency.

Extent of the constituency
The assembly constituency presently comprises five municipal divisions and the following neighbourhoods:

Members of Legislative Assembly

Election results

2018

2014

2009

2008 By-Election

Trivia
 Jayasudha, famous Telugu actress won from the constituency in 2009 Legislative Assembly Election.
 In 2014 Telangana Assembly Elections this is the only seat won by ruling Telangana Rashtra Samithi in Hyderabad district.

See also
 Secunderabad
 List of constituencies of Telangana Legislative Assembly

References

Assembly constituencies of Telangana